Ruber Albeiro Marín Valencia (born June 7, 1968 in Argelia, Valle del Cauca) is a Colombian cyclist who competed in the 1996 and 2000 Summer Olympics.

Major results

1991
1st Stage 1 Vuelta a Colombia
1992
Vuelta a Colombia
1st Stages 1 & 7
1993
Clásico RCN
1st Stages 2 & 3
10th Overall Vuelta a Colombia
1st Stages 4 & 9
1994
1st Stage 10 Vuelta a Colombia
1995
1st Stage 1 Vuelta a Colombia
1st Stage 9 Clásico RCN
1999
1st Stage 3 Vuelta a Colombia
2000
1st Stage 13 Vuelta a Colombia
1st Stage 10 Vuelta al Táchira
2002
9th Overall Tour de Langkawi
2003
1st Stage 6 Vuelta al Táchira
9th Overall Tour de Langkawi
2004
6th Overall Tour de Langkawi
1st Stage 9

References
sports-reference

External links

1968 births
Living people
Sportspeople from Valle del Cauca Department
Colombian male cyclists
Cyclists at the 1991 Pan American Games
Cyclists at the 1996 Summer Olympics
Cyclists at the 1999 Pan American Games
Cyclists at the 2000 Summer Olympics
Olympic cyclists of Colombia
Vuelta a Colombia stage winners
Pan American Games competitors for Colombia
Pan American Games medalists in cycling
20th-century Colombian people
21st-century Colombian people
Medalists at the 1991 Pan American Games
Pan American Games gold medalists for Colombia